The 2014 Malaysian Open, Kuala Lumpur was a professional tennis tournament played on hard courts. It was the sixth edition of the tournament, and part of the 2014 ATP World Tour. It took place in Kuala Lumpur, Malaysia between 22 and 28 September 2014.

Eric Butorac and Raven Klaasen were the defending champions, but lost to Andre Begemann and Julian Knowle in the first round.

Marcin Matkowski and Leander Paes won the title, defeating Jamie Murray and John Peers in the final, 3–6, 7–6(7–5), [10–5].

Seeds

Draw

Draw

References
 Main Draw

Malaysian Open, Kuala Lumpur - Doubles